A soliloquy (from Latin solo "to oneself" + loquor "I talk", plural soliloquies) is a monologue addressed to oneself, thoughts spoken out loud without addressing another.

Soliloquies are used as a device in drama to let a character make their thoughts known to the audience, address it directly or take it into their confidence, wholly or in part. English Renaissance drama used soliloquies to great effect, such as in the soliloquy "To be, or not to be", the centerpiece of Shakespeare's Hamlet.

See also
Aside
Backstory
Exposition (narrative)
Internal monologue
List of narrative techniques
Narration

References

Literature
Drama